Roselawn, also known as Lawton House, is a historic house located near Allendale, Allendale County, South Carolina. It was built between about 1835 and 1840 by Joseph Lawton, a local minister and brother to Benjamin Lawton, signer of the South Carolina Ordinance of Succession. Roselawn is a -story, raised cottage-style clapboard dwelling with a broken gable roof.  The front façade features three dormer windows and a full-width piazza.  Lawton family tradition holds that Union General Hugh Judson Kilpatrick camped at Roselawn while in the area. Roselawn has remained in the Lawton family throughout its entire history.

It was added to the National Register of Historic Places in 1976.

References

Plantation houses in South Carolina
Houses on the National Register of Historic Places in South Carolina
Houses completed in 1840
Houses in Allendale County, South Carolina
National Register of Historic Places in Allendale County, South Carolina